Serres Racing Circuit is a motor racing circuit in the City of Serres in Greece. The operator is "Serres Circuit S.A". The main shareholder is the Municipality of Serres owning the 76.5% of the shares.

History 
It was built by the Municipality of Serres and started its operations in May 1998. Resurfacing works took place in 2012.

Specifications 
This makes it the largest in Greece. It has 16 turns, 7 to the left and 9 to the right. It is the only racing circuit in Greece that meets the construction specifications of the International Automobile Federation - FIA and of the International Motorcycling Federation - FIM. It also meets the safety requirements for races of up to Formula 3 level.

Facilities 
There is a media center that can accommodate up to 50 people, three (3) VIP rooms with a view of the pits, five (5) soundproofed rooms to allow live broadcasting, an award-ceremony room, and two (2) cafe-restaurants offering breakfast, all day meals, coffee, and beverages

References 

Serres
Motorsport venues in Greece